Integrin alpha-2, or CD49b (cluster of differentiation 49b), is a protein which in humans is encoded by the CD49b gene.

The CD49b protein is an integrin alpha subunit. It makes up half of the α2β1 integrin duplex. Integrins are heterodimeric integral membrane glycoproteins composed of a distinct alpha chain and a common beta chain. They are found on a wide variety of cell types including T cells (the NKT cells), NK cells, fibroblasts and platelets. Integrins are involved in cell adhesion and also participate in cell-surface-mediated signalling.

Expression of CD49b in conjunction with LAG-3 has been used to identify type 1 regulatory (Tr1) cells.

The DX5 monoclonal antibody recognizes mouse CD49b.

Interactions 

CD49b has been shown to interact with MMP1.

References

External links 
 
 PDBe-KB provides an overview of all the structure information available in the PDB for Human Integrin alpha 2

Further reading

External links 
ITGA2 Info with links in the Cell Migration Gateway 
 

Integrins